The 1964 Texas A&M Aggies baseball team represented Texas A&M University in the 1964 NCAA University Division baseball season. The Aggies played their home games at Travis Park. The team was coached by Tom Chandler in his 6th year at Texas A&M.

The Aggies won the District VI playoff to advance to the College World Series, where they were defeated by the Seton Hall.

Roster

Schedule 

! style="" | Regular Season
|- valign="top" 

|- align="center" bgcolor="#ffcccc"
| 1 || March  ||  || Travis Park • College Station, Texas || 3–6 || 0–1 || –
|- align="center" bgcolor="#ffcccc"
| 2 || March 7 ||  || Travis Park • College Station, Texas || 0–2 || 0–2 || –
|- align="center" bgcolor="#ccffcc"
| 3 || March  ||  || Travis Park • College Station, Texas || 5–4 || 1–2 || –
|- align="center" bgcolor="#ffcccc"
| 4 || March  || Sul Ross State || Travis Park • College Station, Texas || 0–3 || 1–3 || –
|- align="center" bgcolor="#ccffcc"
| 5 || March 14 ||  || Travis Park • College Station, Texas || 9–2 || 2–3 || –
|- align="center" bgcolor="#ccffcc"
| 6 || March  || Texas Lutheran || Travis Park • College Station, Texas || 13–4 || 3–3 || –
|- align="center" bgcolor="#ccffcc"
| 7 || March 18 || at  || Unknown • Fort Worth, Texas || 7–14 || 3–4 || 0–1
|- align="center" bgcolor="#ccffcc"
| 8 || March 21 ||  || Travis Park • College Station, Texas || 5–2 || 4–4 || 1–1
|- align="center" bgcolor="#ccffcc"
| 9 || March  || Minnesota || Travis Park • College Station, Texas || 7–2 || 5–4 || 1–1
|- align="center" bgcolor="#ccffcc"
| 10 || March  || Minnesota || Travis Park • College Station, Texas || 3–2 || 6–4 || 1–1
|-

|- align="center" bgcolor="#ffcccc"
| 11 || April 1 || at  || Unknown • Waco, Texas || 7–8 || 6–5 || 1–2
|- align="center" bgcolor="#ccffcc"
| 12 || April 4 || at  || Rice Baseball Field • Houston, Texas || 9–5 || 7–5 || 2–2
|- align="center" bgcolor="#ccffcc"
| 13 || April 6 ||  || Travis Park • College Station, Texas || 12–2 || 8–5 || 2–2
|- align="center" bgcolor="#ccffcc"
| 14 || April 7 ||  || Travis Park • College Station, Texas || 3–2 || 9–5 || 3–2
|- align="center" bgcolor="#ccffcc"
| 15 || April 10 || TCU || Travis Park • College Station, Texas || 5–1 || 10–5 || 4–2
|- align="center" bgcolor="#ccffcc"
| 16 || April 11 || TCU || Travis Park • College Station, Texas || 5–1 || 11–5 || 5–2
|- align="center" bgcolor="#ccffcc"
| 17 || April 14 || at St. Mary's (TX) || Unknown • San Antonio, Texas || 9–1 || 12–5 || 5–2
|- align="center" bgcolor="#ccffcc"
| 18 || April  || SMU || Travis Park • College Station, Texas || 6–1 || 13–5 || 6–2
|- align="center" bgcolor="#ccffcc"
| 19 || April 18 || at SMU || Unknown • Dallas, Texas || 7–2 || 14–5 || 7–2
|- align="center" bgcolor="#ccffcc"
| 20 || April 24 || Rice || Travis Park • College Station, Texas || 2–0 || 15–5 || 8–2
|- align="center" bgcolor="#ccffcc"
| 21 || April 28 || Rice || Travis Park • College Station, Texas || 11–4 || 16–5 || 9–2
|-

|- align="center" bgcolor="#ccffcc"
| 22 || May 1 || Baylor || Travis Park • College Station, Texas || 7–4 || 17–5 || 10–2
|- align="center" bgcolor="#ccffcc"
| 23 || May 2 || Baylor || Travis Park • College Station, Texas || 2–0 || 18–5 || 11–2
|- align="center" bgcolor="#bbbbbb"
| 24 || May 7 || at Texas || Clark Field • Austin, Texas || 5–5 || 18–5–1 || 11–2–1
|- align="center" bgcolor="#ffcccc"
| 25 || May 8 || at Texas || Clark Field • Austin, Texas || 2–3 || 18–6–1 || 11–3–1
|- align="center" bgcolor="#ccffcc"
| 26 || May 8 || at Texas || Clark Field • Austin, Texas || 5–2 || 19–6–1 || 12–3–1
|-

|-
|-
! style="" | Postseason
|- valign="top"

|- align="center" bgcolor="#ffcccc"
| 27 || June 8 || vs Minnesota || Omaha Municipal Stadium • Omaha, Nebraska || 3–7 || 19–7–1 || 12–3–1
|- align="center" bgcolor="#ffcccc"
| 28 || June 10 || vs Seton Hall || Omaha Municipal Stadium • Omaha, Nebraska || 5–14 || 19–8–1 || 12–3–1
|-

Awards and honors 
Jerry Ballard
 All-Southwest Conference

Bill Grochett
 All-Southwest Conference

Jerry Koonce
 All-Southwest Conference

Bill Hancock
 All-Southwest Conference

George Hargett
 All-Southwest Conference

Steve Hillhouse
 All-Southwest Conference

Frank Stark
 All-Southwest Conference

References 

Texas A&M Aggies baseball seasons
Texas A&M Aggies baseball
College World Series seasons
Texas A&M
Southwest Conference baseball champion seasons